José Luis Sánchez may refer to:

 José Luis Sánchez Paraíso (José Luis Sánchez Paraíso, 1942–2017), Spanish sprinter
 José Sánchez del Río (José Luis Sánchez del Río, 1913–1928), Mexican boy martyr and blessed
 José Luis Sánchez (Argentine footballer) (José Luis "Garrafa" Sánchez, 1974–2006), Argentine football midfielder
 José Luis Sánchez Fernández (José Luis Sánchez Fernández, born 1926), Spanish sculptor
 José Luis Sánchez (Chilean footballer) (José Luis Sánchez Moretti, born 1970), Chilean football forward
 José Luis Sánchez (sport shooter) (José Luis Sánchez Castillo, born 1987), Mexican sport shooter